Donn is a given name in the Irish language. Donn was originally a byname, which had two meanings: one of the meanings was "brown"; the other was "chief" or "noble". Its use as a given name today is represents a short form of any of the various of Gaelic names that begin with the first element donn-. A variant form of the name is Don.

People with the byname
 Domnall Donn (died 696), king of Dál Riata
 Donnchad Donn (died 944), High King of Ireland
 Gofraid Donn, (fl. 13th century), King of the Isles
 William Donn de Burgh, 3rd Earl of Ulster (1312-1333), noble in the Peerage of Ireland
 Rob Donn (1714-1778), Scottish Gaelic poet

People with the given name
 Donn A. Starry (born 1925), retired United States Army four-star general
 Donn Arden (1916-1994), American choreographer
 Donn Cabral (born 1989), American track and field athlete
 Donn B. Murphy (21st century), President and Executive Director of the National Theatre in Washington, D.C.
 Donn Cambern (born 1929), American film editor
 Donn Clendenon (1935-2005), first baseman in Major League Baseball
 Donn Cothaid mac Cathail (died 773), King of Connacht
 Donn F. Draeger (1922-1982), American judoka
 Donn F. Eisele (1930-1987), United States Air Force officer
 Donn F. Porter (1931-1952), soldier in the United States Army
 Donn Fendler (born 1927), Boy Scout
 Donn Landee (21st century), American record producer and engineer
 Donn Moomaw (born 1931), American football player
 Donn Pall (born 1962), former American professional baseball player
 Donn Pearce (born 1928), American author
 Donn Swaby (born 1973), American actor
 Donn Tatum (1913-1993), president of Walt Disney Productions
 Donn Trenner (born 1927), American jazz pianist
 Donn Barber (1871-1925), American architect

See also
List of Irish-language given names

References

Irish-language masculine given names